The filmy dome spider (Neriene radiata) is a sheet weaver: a spider in the family Linyphiidae with a holarctic distribution. These spiders construct a dome of fine spider silk and hang upside-down under it, waiting for their prey. It is a preferential host for the kleptoparasitic Argyrodes trigonum.

References

Linyphiidae
Articles containing video clips
Holarctic spiders